The 2017 Football West season was the fourth season under the new competition format in Western Australia. The NPL premier Bayswater City qualified for the National Premier Leagues finals series, and were eliminated at the quarter-final stage.

Pre-season changes

League tables

2017 National Premier Leagues WA

The 2017 National Premier Leagues WA season was played over 26 rounds commencing in February 2017, followed by a Top 4 Finals series. A revised Relegation system for the bottom team will depend on whether the two Division 1 teams that meet NPL WA eligibility criteria finish in the top 4 of the league season. If either come first, the bottom team will be relegated, but if one comes second, third or fourth, then there will be a promotion/relegation playoff.

Finals
The Top Four Cup, known as the McInerney Ford Top Four Cup for sponsorship reasons, was played as a finals competition at the conclusion of the regular season.

Promotion/relegation play-off
As both Forrestfield United and South West Phoenix met the requirement criteria for NPL WA eligibility, if either came first in the league then they would be promoted to the 2018 NPL Western Australia. But as neither came first, then Forrestfield  as the highest of the two – that came either second, third or fourth – played a two-legged Promotion and relegation play-off against Mandurah City.

Forrestfield United won 6–3 on aggregate, and promoted to the NPLWA in 2018.

2017 WA State League Division 1

The 2017 Season is for the second tier domestic football competition in Western Australia. Western Knights were champions, having won the league with one week to spare.

Promotion/relegation play-off

Morley-Windmills won 7–4 on aggregate, and promoted to the 2018 State League Division 1.

2017 WA State League Division 2

The 2017 WA State League Division 2 Season was the third tier domestic football competition in Western Australia. The top team at the end of the year was promoted to the 2018 WA State League Division 1, with the second, third and fourth teams qualifying to a two-round promotion/relegation playoff.

2017 Women's State League Premier Division

The highest tier domestic football competition in Western Australia is known as the BankWest Women's State League Premier Division for sponsorship reasons.  The 7 teams play each other three times, for a total of 18 matches over 21 rounds.

Promotion/relegation play-off

Bassendean Caledonians won 3–2 on aggregate, but were still not a part of the Women’s Premier League in 2018.

2017 State Cup

Western Australian soccer clubs competed in 2017 for the Football West State Cup. Clubs entered from the National Premier Leagues WA, the two divisions of the State League, a limited number of teams from various divisions of the 2017 Amateur League competition, and from regional teams from the South West, Goldfields, and Great Southern regions.

This knockout competition was won by Western Knights, their third title.

The competition also served as the Western Australian Preliminary rounds for the 2017 FFA Cup. In addition to the A-League club Perth Glory, the two finalists – Sorrento FC and Western Knights – qualified for the final rounds, entering at the Round of 32.

References

Football West
2017